The Hungarian National Alliance (MNSZ) was a short-lived electoral coalition in Hungary, formed in December 2003 by minor right-wing parties and movements to jointly contest the 2004 European Parliament election, the first in Hungary.

History
The alliance was founded by independent MP Gyula Balogh, who had been a member of the Independent Smallholders' Party (FKGP) and Fidesz. He left the latter's parliamentary group in May 2003. Some members of the FKGP, Hungarian Justice and Life Party (MIÉP) and the entire Hungarian Entrepreneurs' Unity Party (MAVEP), the Pensioners' Party (NYUP), the Renewed Independent Smallholders' Party (MFKGP), the Party for a Healthy Hungary (EMP) and many civil organizations also joined the electoral coalition. The cooperation negotiations with the Social Democratic Party (SZDP) remained unsuccessful.

In its programme, the MNSZ emphasized the protection of Hungarian soil, the granting dual citizenship to the ethnic Hungarians in the neighboring countries and preventing the privatization of hospitals. The MNSZ was able to gather the required number of signatures to the participation in the EP election. On 13 June 2004, the MNSZ received 20,226 votes (0.66%) and gained no seats. Two days before the election, alliance leader Gyula Balogh turned to the National Election Committee (OVB), because, according to him, the national broadcasters violated the principle of equality of opportunity, but his petition has been rejected. Shortly after the EP election, the MNSZ collapsed.

Election results

European Parliament

References

Sources

External links
Nemzeti Szövetség: a média kirekeszti a kispártokat

2003 establishments in Hungary
2004 disestablishments in Hungary
Defunct political party alliances in Hungary